Desangre is a Mexican death metal/grindcore band formed in 2006.

Discography

Full-length albums
Solo Carniceria (2008)
Resurreccion (2013)

EPs
Eres Humano o Eres Basura (2012)

External links

Grindcore musical groups
Extreme metal musical groups
Mexican death metal musical groups
Mexican heavy metal musical groups